Chau Tau (Chinese: 洲頭) is a proposed station in the Lok Ma Chau Spur Line, a branch-off from East Rail line. The station will be situated at Chau Tau, near Lok Ma Chau, near the border between Yuen Long and North District in the New Territories, Hong Kong.

However, according to the map in the 2011 MTR Annual Report, the Northern Link has adopted the design of having 2 termini to the north (like Tseung Kwan O line), terminating at both the present Lok Ma Chau station and the proposed Kwu Tung station, and Chau Tau Station was not shown on the map, meaning that this station might not be built. However, this station may still be built as an intermediate station on the Lok Ma Chau branch of both lines.

References
 This article draws some information from the corresponding article in Chinese Wikipedia.

Lok Ma Chau
Yuen Long District
MTR stations in the New Territories
Proposed railway stations in Hong Kong